Impetus may refer to:

 A source of motivation
 Theory of impetus, a concept similar to inertia and momentum
 Impetus (album), a 1997 re-release of the EP Passive Restraints
 Impetus (waltz), a ballroom dance step